The Green Wave or Green Tide (Spanish: "Marea verde") is a grouping of abortion-rights movements in various countries in the Americas that have collectively adopted the colour green as a symbol of their movement and successfully pushed governments to expand abortion access in multiple countries across Latin America, a region known for some of the strictest anti-abortion laws in the world.

Green Wave activists have contributed to the 2020 legalisation of abortion in Argentina, the 2022 decriminalisation of abortion in Colombia, and exemption to the abortion ban for cases of rape in Ecuador. After the Supreme Court of Mexico issued a unanimous 2021 ruling that decriminalised abortion in the country, chief justice Arturo Zaldívar Lelo de Larrea credited the Green Wave activists for shifting the national consciousness as well as the position of the Mexican Supreme Court on the issue, saying: "It kept getting harder and harder to go against their legitimate demands".

Green bandanas were first adopted as a symbol by Argentinian abortion and family planning rights activists in 2003, drawing inspiration from the Mothers of the Plaza de Mayo protesters who similarly used white scarves (opponents of abortion rights in Argentina in turn began using blue bandanas as their symbol). Green bandanas were also used by Argentinian Ni una menos anti-femicide protesters in 2015. By 2020, green bandanas were being used by abortion rights proponents in several other Latin American countries. During the 2020s, multiple Latin American countries decriminalised abortion. After the Supreme Court of the United States overturned a precedent that mandated abortion access federally and multiple U.S. states began restricting abortion access as a result, abortion rights protesters in the United States also began using green as their symbol.

See also 

 Green scarf

References 

Abortion-rights movement
Abortion in Central America
Abortion in the Americas